Jonathan Crush is a South African professor at the Balsillie School of International Affairs and a founder of the Southern African Migration Programme.

Early life and career 
Jonathan Crush was raised in South Africa, Swaziland and Zimbabwe. He completed his A levels at Waterford Kamhlaba United World College Southern Africa in Swaziland in 1971.

In 1972, he emigrated to England and enrolled at University of Cambridge where he obtained his degree in 1976. He then moved to Canada where he first completed his master's degree at the Wilfrid Laurier University in 1978 and then a Ph.D. at Queen's University 1983. He was a faculty member at Queen's University from 1987 to 2012.

From 1996 he became Director of the South African Migration Project (an international network of organisations founded in 1996 to promote awareness of migration-development linkages in the Southern African Development Community). In February 2005 he was awarded an Honorary Professorship at the University of Cape Town. From 2012 to present day he holds the Research Chair in Global Migration and Development at the Balsillie School of International Affairs.

Crush has published more than 160 works in a diversity of publications including The Daily Maverick.

He was interviewed by eNCA during the 2015 Growing Informal Cities conference in Cape Town.

Selected works
1991 – 
1995 – 
2016 –

References

External links

Jonathan Crush on LinkedIn
Jonathan Crush on ResearchGate
Publications at the Centre for International Governance Innovation
Publications at Africa Portal
Waterford Kamhlaba United World College Southern Africa website

20th-century births
Living people
South African scientists
Alumni of the University of Cambridge
Wilfrid Laurier University alumni
Waterford Kamhlaba alumni
People educated at a United World College
Academic staff of Queen's University at Kingston
Year of birth missing (living people)